Brio is a bus rapid transit system in El Paso, Texas, United States. It is operated by Sun Metro.

The first line, the Mesa Corridor, began operating in the fall of 2014. Two more corridors, Dyer (Northeast) and Alameda (Mission Valley) Corridors became operational in October 2018. The Montana Corridor, which serves the Eastside, opened on November 6, 2022.

Description

Each Brio corridor contains at least two transfer centers, where passengers can transfer between Brio and local buses. Outside of transfer centers, stops consist of curbside shelters with the following amenities:
 Free WiFi
 Translucent panels for better lighting
 Bike racks
 Shade screens
 Electronic real-time displays
 Ticket vending machine (TVM)
 Solar-powered compacting trash can
 Displays of unique public artwork

The Brio fleet consists of  branded New Flyer Xcelsior articulated buses powered by compressed natural gas, able to carry 72 total passengers and feature on-board WiFi, interior bike racks, and passenger information monitors. Each bus also contains three doors to facilitate a quicker boarding process.

The vehicles operate in mixed traffic. Signal prioritization is used to lengthen green traffic signals and reduce delays. The frequency of Brio buses range from 10 minutes during weekday rush hours to 15 minutes mid-day from Monday to Friday, 20 minutes on Saturdays and 25 minutes on Sundays. Stations are located about a mile apart. Passengers can buy a one-way trip, a day pass, a weekly pass or a monthly pass from the ticket vending machine located at all permanent Brio stations. To prevent fare evasion, Brio Ambassadors will be monitoring and requesting proof of payment during trips on Brio.

Over 50,000 people use Brio every month, which has meant that approximately 20 tonnes of carbon dioxide was not emitted in the first year of its operation. Brio has also inspired new businesses; around 20 have been launched since Brio was launched as of 2016.

Naming the system
Sun Metro hired PAVLOV, a marketing communications company, to develop the system name and logo. The word Brio is Spanish for excitement, verve and energy.

The logo was designed to complement the circular nature of Sun Metro's current logo. The ‘b’ and ‘o’ in Brio are a graphic element that can be used to extend the identity of the RTS system. The movement within the logotype references the wheels on the vehicles. In addition to the name and logo, Sun Metro selected a color palette and graphic standards to make Brio stations and buses distinctive and easily recognizable.

Fares

Fares for Brio are the same as standard fare on other Sun Metro lines. Currently, the standard fare is $1.50, $1.00 for students, and $0.30 for seniors 65+, disabled and Medicare. Sun Metro also offers daily, weekly, and monthly passes for each fare category.

Lines

Mesa Corridor

 Length: about 
 Beginning of route: Downtown Transfer Center
 End of route: Westside Transfer Center
 Total number of buses: 10
 Number of stations: 22
 Total project cost: $27.1 million
 FTA funding: $15.6 million
 TXDOT funding: $5.5 million
 Operational: currently operational

Alameda Corridor
 Length: 
 Beginning of route: Downtown Transfer Center
 End of route: Mission Valley Transfer Center
 Total number of buses: 14
 Number of stations: 29
 Total construction project cost: $38.3 million
 Funding: 100 percent City of El Paso
 Operational: currently operational

Dyer Corridor
 Length: 
 Beginning of route: Downtown Transfer Center
 End of route: Northeast Transfer Center
 Total number of buses: 10
 Number of stations: 22
 Total project cost: $35.9 million
 FTA funding (anticipated): $21.7 million
 TXDOT funding: $6.6 million
 Operational: currently operational

Montana Corridor
 Length: 
 Beginning of route: Five Points Terminal
 End of route: Future Far East Side Transfer Center
 Total no. of buses: 14
 Number of stations: 25
 Total project cost: $47 million
 FTA funding (anticipated): $29.5 million
 TXDOT funding: $8 million
 Operational: currently operational

References

Transportation in El Paso, Texas
2014 establishments in Texas
2014 in transport
Bus rapid transit in Texas
Transit authorities with natural gas buses
Bus transport brands